Frank "Rebel" Duncan (May 4, 1888 - April 16, 1958) was an American Negro league outfielder and manager for several years before the founding of the first Negro National League.

Sportswriters Harry Daniels and Jimmy Smith both named Duncan to their 1909 "All American Team" saying he was "one of the most dangerous men at bat a pitcher can face, also a dare-devil base runner."

References

External links
 and Baseball-Reference Black Baseball stats and Seamheads
  and Seamheads

1888 births
1958 deaths
20th-century African-American people
Baseball outfielders
Negro league baseball managers
Birmingham Giants players
Philadelphia Giants players
Leland Giants players
Chicago American Giants players
Cleveland Elites players
Cleveland Hornets players
Cleveland Tigers (baseball) players
Detroit Stars players
Chicago Giants players
Bacharach Giants players
Toledo Tigers players
Milwaukee Bears players
San Francisco Park players
American expatriate baseball players in Cuba
Baseball players from Georgia (U.S. state)
Sportspeople from Macon, Georgia